Ferrière or Ferrières may refer to: 

Château Ferrière, a Bordeaux wine producer in Margaux
Château de Ferrières, in the Seine-et-Marne département of France
Ferrières Abbey in Ferrières-en-Gâtinais

Places

Belgium 
Ferrières, Belgium, a municipality of Wallonia in the province of Liège

France 
Ferrière-et-Lafolie, in the Haute-Marne département
Ferrière-la-Grande, in the Nord département
Ferrière-la-Petite, in the Nord département
Ferrière-Larçon, in the Indre-et-Loire département
Ferrière-sur-Beaulieu, in the Indre-et-Loire département
Ferrières, Charente-Maritime, in the Charente-Maritime département
Ferrières, Manche, in the Manche département
Ferrières, Meurthe-et-Moselle, in the Meurthe-et-Moselle département
Ferrières, Oise, in the Oise département
Ferrières, Hautes-Pyrénées, in the Hautes-Pyrénées département
Ferrières, Somme, in the Somme département
Ferrières, Tarn, in the Tarn département
Ferrières-en-Bray, in the Seine-Maritime département
Ferrières-en-Brie, in the Seine-et-Marne département
Ferrières-en-Gâtinais, in the Loiret département
Ferrières-Haut-Clocher, in the Eure département
Ferrières-la-Verrerie, in the Orne département
Ferrières-le-Lac, in the Doubs département
Ferrières-les-Bois, in the Doubs département
Ferrières-lès-Ray, in the Haute-Saône département
Ferrières-lès-Scey, in the Haute-Saône département
Ferrières-les-Verreries, in the Hérault département
Ferrières-Poussarou, in the Hérault département
Ferrières-Saint-Hilaire, in the Eure département
Ferrières-Saint-Mary, in the Cantal département
Ferrières-sur-Ariège, in the Ariège département
Ferrières-sur-Sichon, in the Allier département

People
Alexandre de Ferrière (died after 1845), French playwright, journalist, printer, publisher and writer
Charles de Ferrieres (1823–1908), British Member of Parliament
Charles Grangier de la Ferrière (1738–1794), French general of the War of the First Coalition
Jean-Michel Ferrière (born 1959), French footballer
Raoul de Ferrières, Norman nobleman and trouvère

See also
 La Ferrière (disambiguation)
 Ferriere, a comune (municipality) in the Province of Piacenza in the Italian region Emilia-Romagna
 Rick LaFerriere (born 1961), Canadian ice hockey goaltender